Peters Creek is a stream in Madison County in the U.S. state of Missouri. It is a tributary of Twelvemile Creek.

The identity of namesake Peters is unknown.

See also
List of rivers of Missouri

References

Rivers of Madison County, Missouri
Rivers of Missouri